Georges Thiébaud (16 March 1850 in Toulouse – 21 January 1915 in Paris) was a French journalist, Bonapartist and nationalist.  He and comte Dillon launched an American-style press campaign in favour of général Boulanger.

After his Boulangist engagement, he joined the antidreyfusard camp. Hostile to Protestantism, he founded an anti-Protestant league.  He was accused of complicity in the coup d'état averted by Paul Déroulède in 1899.

Publications 
M. Taine et le prince Napoléon, leur controverse sur Napoléon, leurs conclusions sur la France contemporaine, conférence, Paris, Dentu, 1887.
Le Parti protestant, les progrès du protestantisme en France depuis 25 ans, conférence, Paris, Savine, 1895.
Au-devant de Marchand, discours, Paris, Malverge, 1899.
La Patrie française, conférence, Paris, La Patrie française, 1900.
Le Palais de la gabegie, étude à fleur de peau de la situation municipale et des finances de la ville de Paris. Le devoir nationaliste à l'hôtel de ville, Paris, Librairie antisémite, 1900.
Souvenirs d'un publiciste (1908-1909). Les Secrets du règne, Paris, La Renaissance française, 1909.

1850 births
1915 deaths
Writers from Toulouse
19th-century French journalists
French nationalists
Bonapartists
Politicians of the French Third Republic
French male writers
Members of the Ligue de la patrie française
Burials at Montparnasse Cemetery
Chevaliers of the Légion d'honneur
Politicians from Toulouse